Nicolas Rousseau (born 16 March 1983) is a French professional road bicycle racer for . He won stage 3 of the 2010 La Tropicale Amissa Bongo.

Achievements

2000
1st Chrono des Nations Juniors
2001
1st Chrono des Nations Juniors
2005
5th Boucle de l'Artois
2006
3rd Overall Boucles de la Mayenne
4th Overall Tour de Gironde
5th La Roue Tourangelle
10th Overall Tour du Poitou Charentes et de la Vienne
2008
5th Overall Tour du Poitou Charentes et de la Vienne
6th Grand Prix de la Somme
2009
1st Stage 1 Route du Sud
4th Overall Tour du Poitou Charentes et de la Vienne
7th Boucles de l'Aulne
10th Tour du Doubs
2010
8th Overall La Tropicale Amissa Bongo
1st Stage 3

External links 
 

French male cyclists
1983 births
Living people
Olympic cyclists of France
Cyclists at the 2008 Summer Olympics
Sportspeople from Indre-et-Loire
French track cyclists
Cyclists from Centre-Val de Loire